Area code 206 is a telephone area code in the North American Numbering Plan (NANP) for the U.S. state of Washington. The numbering plan area (NPA) includes Seattle and most of its innermost suburbs. This includes such suburbs as Shoreline and Lake Forest Park; Mercer, Bainbridge, and Vashon Islands; and portions of metropolitan Seattle from Des Moines to Woodway.

As of January 2017, 206 was one of the last urbanized numbering plan areas in North America without an area code overlay, making Seattle one of the largest cities where calls could still be originated by seven-digit dialing. On January 28, 2017, area code 564 was activated as an overlay for most of the western portion of Washington, and ten-digit dialing became mandatory on July 29, 2017.

History
Area code 206 was one of the original North American area codes assigned in 1947, when it served the entire state of Washington. In 1957, area code 509 was assigned for the eastern two-thirds of Washington in a flash-cut, with the split roughly following the Cascade Mountains.

Despite western Washington's growth in the second half of the 20th century, this configuration remained in place for 38 years. By the start of the 1990s, however, 206 was nearing exhaustion of central office codes from proliferation of cell phones, pagers, and fax machines.

On January 15, 1995, most of the old 206 territory outside of the Seattle/Tacoma area was split off with area code 360, which was one of the first two area codes not conforming to the then-traditional N0X/N1X format.

Numerous residents in the Seattle exurbs protested about no longer being associated with 206, leading US West, now part of Lumen Technologies, to renumber these areas back to 206, shortly after the split.  As part of the reintegration, the cities of Des Moines and Woodway were both split between the new area codes, required by the capacity of the switching centers.

206 was rapidly exhausting even after the 360 split. The return of these exurbs, combined with the continued proliferation of cell phones, faxes, and pagers, hastened a three-way split of the 206 territory, effective on April 25, 1997.  The southern portion, including Tacoma, received area code 253, while the northern portion, including Everett and the Eastside, was assigned area code 425.

See also

List of NANP area codes

References

206
206
Telecommunications-related introductions in 1947